Juan Diego is a Spanish compound name which may refer to many people, Including:

Juan Diego (actor) (1942–2022), Spanish actor
Juan Diego Angeloni (born 1978), Argentine rifle shooter
Juan Diego Bernardino (1460–1544), one of two Aztec peasants alleged to have had visions of the Virgin Mary as Our Lady of G­alupe
Juan Diego Botto (born 1975), Argentine-Spanish actor
Juan Diego Covarrubias (born 1987), Mexican actor
Juan Diego del Castillo (1744–1793), Spanish pharmacist and botanist
Juan Diego Flórez (born 1973), Peruvian opera singer
Juan Diego González Alzate (born 1980), Colombian footballer
Juan Diego Gonzalez-Vigil (born 1985), Peruvian footballer
Juan Diego Madrigal (born 1986), Costa Rican footballer
Juan Diego Ramírez (born 1971), road cyclist from Colombia
Juan Diego Solanas (born 1966), Argentine film director
Saint Juan Diego (1474–1548), the first indigenous American saint
Juan Diego Ramirez (officer) (1710–1737), officer in the Spanish-Portuguese War